Plaksha University is a private university located in Mohali, Punjab, India. It is set up by a group of over 60 business leaders and technology entrepreneurs. It is a corporate-funded technical university, which is being established under the Punjab State Private Universities Policy of 2010. It has received a Letter of Intent from the Government of Punjab.

Academics
The university began its Undergraduate program in September 2021 with a class of 95 students. The university aims to integrate engineering education and research with liberal arts, design and entrepreneurship. The Reimagining Higher Education Foundation, the sponsoring body of Plaksha, currently offers one-year Tech Leaders Fellowship, a residential post-graduate program in collaboration with Purdue University and UC Berkeley.

Fees and Funding 
The University offers many merit and need based scholarships ranging from 25% of program cost to 100% on tuition fee, hostel, and meals.

Campus 
The 50-acres campus is being built in Sector 101 A near the Chandigarh International Airport.

References

External links

Universities and colleges in Punjab, India
Universities in Punjab, India
Education in Mohali
Private universities in India
Engineering colleges in Punjab, India